Granada Cinema may refer to the following establishments in England:

 Granada Cinema, Chichester
 Granada Cinema, Harrow
 Granada Cinema, Tooting
 Granada Cinema, Woolwich

See also
Granada plc